DUT may refer to:

Education 
 Da Nang University of Technology, in Vietnam
 Dalian University of Technology, in China
 Delft University of Technology, in the Netherlands
 Durban University of Technology in South Africa
 Diplôme universitaire de technologie, a French undergraduate university degree in technology

Other uses
 Device under test, an item of equipment being tested
 DUT (gene)
 Drinking-up time, a former feature of United Kingdom alcohol licensing law
 DUT1 or DUT, a value used for time correction 
 Unalaska Airport (IATA airport code "DUT"), in Alaska, U.S.
 D. Ut., an abbreviation for the United States District Court for the District of Utah